Robert Oscar Baker (December 21, 1926 – February 9, 2012) is an American ice hockey player who competed in ice hockey at the 1948 Winter Olympics.

Career 
Baker was a member of the American ice hockey team which played eight games, but was disqualified, at the 1948 Winter Olympics in St. Moritz, Switzerland. After retiring from professional hockey, Baker worked for IBM for 30 years.

Personal life 
Baker and his wife, Evelyn, were married for 37 years. They had six children. Baker died in Raleigh, North Carolina, in 2012 at the age of 85.

External links

References 

1926 births
2012 deaths
Ice hockey players from Minnesota
Ice hockey players at the 1948 Winter Olympics
Olympic ice hockey players of the United States
People from Thief River Falls, Minnesota
American men's ice hockey right wingers